Roland Dacre Rudd (born April 1961) is the founder and chairman of Finsbury (formerly RLM Finsbury), a public relations firm. Rudd was educated at Oxford University, becoming President of the Oxford Union before starting a career in journalism that he left to found Finsbury. He sold that company to WPP plc in 2001, making an estimated £40 million.

He continues as chairman of Finsbury and has a variety of other charitable and non-executive posts. He is strongly in favour of British engagement with the European Union and has campaigned for electoral reform.

Personal life and education

Rudd was born in April 1961, one of four children of Tony Rudd, a stockbroker; his sisters are Amanda, Melissa and Amber, who was a Conservative Party Member of Parliament until September 2019, when she left the party over its stance on Brexit; she has since sat as an independent MP.

As a child he wanted to be Prime Minister. He was educated at Millfield School. He read philosophy and theology at Regent's Park College, Oxford, describing himself as "perhaps a lazy Christian."

He was elected president of the Oxford Union on his third attempt. At Oxford he was friends with Hugo Dixon with whom he travelled to America to work on Walter Mondale's campaign for the Democratic Party nomination. They transferred to rival Gary Hart when Mondale could not accommodate them.

Marriage
Rudd is married to Sophie Hale, a designer of womenswear.

Career
After graduating, Rudd worked as a policy coordinator for David Owen and the Social Democratic Party (he was the first SDP president of the Oxford Union). He was a financial journalist at the Sunday Correspondent and the Financial Times.

At the Sunday Correspondent, Rudd became friends with Robert Peston, now political editor for ITV News, and they worked together at the Financial Times where the two were known as the "Pest and the Rat". Rudd taking the nickname in reference to the then popular children's television character Roland Rat.

In 1994, Rudd left the Financial Times to found RLM Finsbury with Rupert Younger. Rudd told The Independent in 2011, "I was at the Financial Times, writing about M&A (mergers and acquisitions) and conglomerates. The takeover world always fascinated me. I had wanted to build my own business and could see a gap for a financial PR company which was utterly professional. Right from the start, I hired only the most financially literate staff and was determined to have the top FTSE clients."

The firm was sold to Martin Sorrell's WPP plc in 2001 in a deal estimated to have earned Rudd £40 million. In 2011, RLM Finsbury merged with Robinson Lerer & Montgomery of New York. Rudd continued as chairman of the merged firm. In 2014, RLM Finsbury rebranded as just Finsbury.

Rudd's friendship with Robert Peston, who is known for his scoops, has led some to wonder whether Rudd feeds Peston stories, but Rudd has consistently denied it, saying that Peston finds his stories by himself. "It's an absurd idea" Rudd has said, "Robert has a fantastic network of contacts built up over the years."

Politics
Rudd believes in electoral reform and campaigned in support of the introduction of the Alternative vote system in the British referendum of 2011. The proposal failed. He is strongly in favour of British engagement with Europe, and is chairman of Business for New Europe, a member of the Centre for European Reform's advisory board, and Chair of the People's Vote campaign. As chairman of the People's Vote campaign, he oversaw a boardroom coup that ended up destroying the campaign at a critical juncture in UK politics. 

Rudd is a supporter of the Labour Party and is close to a number of Labour politicians. Lord Mandelson is godfather to one of Rudd's children and Rudd campaigned for Mandelson in his Hartlepool constituency in the 2001 general election. Rudd was one of the "Four Wise Men" who advised Blair in 2007 on life after leaving office. Rudd has also been linked to Ed Balls and Tessa Jowell of Labour, and Nick Clegg of the Liberal Democrats. He subsequently damaged his relationship with many figures in the Labour Party and elsewhere in politics due to his controversial role in the demise of the People's Vote campaign in 2019.

Other appointments
Rudd is a trustee of the Royal Opera House, the Speakers for Schools programme, and the Tate. He was also a trustee of the Garden Bridge Trust. He is a non-executive director of the Army Board, patron of the NSPCC, and was a governor of Wellington College. Rudd became a governor of Millfield schools in 2016 and was appointed chairman of the governors. He is a visiting fellow at Oxford University's Centre for Corporate Reputation, part of the Saïd Business School.

Open Britain controversy

On 27 October 2019, Rudd used his role as the chair of Open Britain—just one of five organisations under the People's Vote umbrella—to announce he wanted to sack James McGrory and Tom Baldwin, as the campaign's director and director of communications. More than 40 staff members walked out in protest at this decision and Rudd's effort to impose Patrick Heneghan as the campaign's interim chief executive. At a subsequent staff meeting Rudd was criticised as a city PR man who had rarely been seen in the offices and a motion of no confidence in his role was passed by 40 votes to 3. Baldwin had earlier accused Rudd of taking a "wrecking ball" to a successful campaign through a "boardroom coup" while failing to consult other organisations in the campaign. Rudd later resigned as chair of Open Britain but retained control of money and data through a new holding company he had formed for the purpose called Baybridge UK. In an excoriating article for the Spectator, Alastair Campbell, the former head of strategy and communications in Tony Blair's Downing Street, accused Rudd of putting his personal status ahead of efforts to stop Brexit through a new referendum.  In 2020, it was announced that former employees were preparing to sue Rudd personally.

See also
Breakingviews

References

External links
Roland Rudd talking on David Cameron not signing the EU treaty 2011.

1961 births
Living people
People educated at Millfield
Alumni of Regent's Park College, Oxford
British public relations people
Roland
National Society for the Prevention of Cruelty to Children people
Presidents of the Oxford Union
Businesspeople from London